SteepleChase Records is a jazz record company and label based in Copenhagen, Denmark. SteepleChase was founded in 1972 by Nils Winther, who was a student at Copenhagen University at the time. He began recording concerts at Jazzhus Montmartre, where many American musicians performed, and was given permission by some of the artists to release the material commercially.

SteepleChase became a haven for many artists who were without contracts with larger labels at the time. In 1987, the label also started the classical label Kontrapunkt.

Discography

1000/31000 Series
The main series of albums released on the Steeplechase label beginning in 1972 had catalog numbers starting at SCS 1001 and when compact discs were introduced in the late 1980s catalog numbers added a 3 before the 1000 series number.

33100 SteepleChase LookOut Series
The SteepleChase LookOut Series releases contemporary new jazz since 2012.

6000 Classics Series
The SteepleChase 6000 Classics series released 36 albums of archive material from 1978 and on.

References

Danish record labels
Jazz record labels
Danish jazz
 
 
IFPI members
1972 establishments in Denmark